The 2009–10 Biathlon World Cup – World Cup 3 is the third event of the season and was held in Pokljuka, Slovenia from Thursday December 17 until Sunday  December 20, 2009.

Schedule of events
The schedule of the event is below

Medal winners

Men

Women

Achievements
 Best performance for all time

 , 13 place in Individual
 , 19 place in Individual
 , 32 place in Individual
 , 37 place in Individual and 4 place in Sprint
 , 69 place in Individual
 , 76 place in Individual
 , 96 place in Individual
 , 3 place in Sprint
 , 5 place in Sprint
 , 10 place in Sprint
 , 19 place in Sprint
 , 25 place in Sprint
 , 37 place in Sprint and 36 place in Pursuit
 , 49 place in Sprint and Pursuit
 , 53 place in Sprint
 , 56 place in Sprint and 46 place in Pursuit
 , 82 place in Sprint
 , 91 place in Sprint
 , 1 place in Pursuit
 , 2 place in Pursuit
 , 7 place in Pursuit
 , 4 place in Individual
 , 11 place in Individual
 , 19 place in Individual
 , 21 place in Individual
 , 22 place in Individual
 , 29 place in Individual
 , 35 place in Individual and 21 place in Sprint
 , 37 place in Individual
 , 49 place in Individual
 , 55 place in Individual and 35 place in Sprint
 , 87 place in Individual
 , 90 place in Individual
 , 8 place in Sprint
 , 15 place in Sprint
 , 24 place in Sprint
 , 29 place in Sprint
 , 32 place in Pursuit

 First World Cup race

 , 50 place in Individual
 , 70 place in Sprint

References

- World Cup 3, 2009-10 Biathlon World Cup
December 2009 sports events in Europe
Biathlon competitions in Slovenia
2009 in Slovenian sport